LaRoche or Laroche is a surname. Notable people with the surname include:

Adam LaRoche, baseball first baseman, son of Dave, and brother of Andy
Andy LaRoche, baseball third baseman, son of Dave, and brother of Adam
Dave LaRoche, baseball pitcher, father of Adam and Andy LaRoche
Emmanuel Laroche, linguist
François Laroche, French general
Gérald Laroche, French actor
Guy Laroche, fashion designer
James La Roche, British member of Parliament for Bodmin from 1768 to 1780
Jean-Edmond Laroche-Joubert (1820–84), French industrialist and politician
John LaRoche (c.1700–52), British Member of Parliament for Bodmin from 1727 to 1747
Louise Laroche, Titanic survivor
Nicholas LaRoche, figure skater
Raymonde de Laroche, early female pilot
John Laroche (b.1962), American horticulturalist
Julie LaRoche (b. 1957), Canadian marine biologist  
  Joseph LaRoche  Titanic Survivor